The National Guard Armory-Pine Bluff is a former National Guard armory at 623 West 2nd Avenue in Pine Bluff, Arkansas.  It is a two-story masonry structure, built out of concrete and buff brick with Art Deco styling, included a castellated parapet.  It was built in 1931, and was the first state-owned militia building in Jefferson County.  It served as a state armory until 1974, housing the 39th Tank Company, and now houses vocational classrooms.

The building was listed on the National Register of Historic Places in 2001.

See also

National Register of Historic Places listings in Jefferson County, Arkansas

References

Art Deco architecture in Arkansas
Buildings and structures completed in 1931
Buildings and structures in Pine Bluff, Arkansas
National Register of Historic Places in Pine Bluff, Arkansas